Thornton's Field Carriage Sidings was a stabling point located in Stratford, London, England. The depot was situated on the north side of the Great Eastern Main Line, between Bethnal Green and Stratford stations.

The depot code was TF.

History 
Before its closure in 2008, Class 47 locomotives and Class 321 EMUs could be seen at the depot.

Present 
The stabling point is now known as Orient Way Carriage Sidings due to its conversion in 2008 which made way for the 2012 Olympics site, where now the Arcelormittal Orbit and UCL campus are situated.

References

Sources

Railway depots in London